Jamie Cruce is an American football coach and former player.  He served as be the head football coach at Bethany College in Lindsborg, Kansas from 2007 to 2012.  He was also a player at the school under hall of fame coach Ted Kessinger.  He is now the high school head coach at Pratt, Kansas.

Cruce resigned from Bethany after the completion of the 2012 season.  His record at Bethany was 28–34 overall and 21–33 in conference play.  His best season was an 8–3 record in 2011, where the team finished third in the conference.

Head coaching record

College

References

External links
 Bethany profile

Year of birth missing (living people)
Living people
American football linebackers
Anderson Ravens football coaches
Bethany Swedes football coaches
Bethany Swedes football players
Hutchinson Blue Dragons football players
Northern State Wolves football coaches
High school football coaches in Kansas
Northern State University alumni
People from Lindsborg, Kansas
People from Pratt, Kansas
Sportspeople from Salina, Kansas
Players of American football from Kansas